John Norman Button (30 June 19338 April 2008) was an Australian politician, who served as a senior minister in the Hawke and Keating Labor governments. He was notable for the Button car plan, which involved downsizing and eventually ending Australia's car industry by reducing tariffs and government protection.

Biography

Button was born in Ballarat, Victoria, and was educated at The Geelong College and the University of Melbourne where he graduated in arts and law. He became a lawyer with Maurice Blackburn & Co and later a barrister in Melbourne and became active in the Australian Labor Party from the late 1950s. In the 1960s he joined a group of other middle-class Labor activists, such as John Cain, Barry Jones, Richard McGarvie, Frank Costigan and Michael Duffy, known as "the Participants" whose objective was to end Left-wing control of the Victorian branch of the Labor Party.

In 1963, Button was invited to run as the Labor candidate for the seat of Chisholm, which was safely held by Wilfrid Kent Hughes. Party members recall that at the declaration of the poll Kent Hughes stood up and said in patrician tones, "It was a fair fight." To which Button replied, "It was neither fair nor a fight. I gained a swing of one: my mother."

In 1970, the Participants formed an alliance with the federal Labor leader Gough Whitlam and the President of the Australian Council of Trade Unions, Bob Hawke, to bring about intervention in the Victorian branch by the Federal Executive. Button became part of the interim Advisory Council which took over the branch after intervention, and in 1974 he was elected to the Australian Senate as a strong supporter of Whitlam.

Button remained a backbencher during the remaining 18 months of the Whitlam government. He was elected to the Opposition Shadow Ministry in 1976 and was elected Deputy Labor Leader in the Senate in 1977. From 1980 to 1983 he was Leader of the Opposition in the Senate and Shadow Minister for Communications. He was also a member of the Labor National Executive.

A close friend of Labor Leader Bill Hayden, Button decided during 1982 that Hayden could not lead the party to victory at the election due in late 1983. When Liberal Prime Minister Malcolm Fraser called a snap election in February 1983, it was Button who told Hayden that he must resign immediately to make way for Bob Hawke. Button tapping Hayden on the shoulder would later be compared to Bill Shorten switching his support from Julia Gillard to Kevin Rudd in 2013. Button did not live to see this comparison as he died in 2008.

In 1983, when Hawke became Prime Minister, Button became Minister for Industry and Commerce, a post he held until 1993 and making him the longest serving minister in this portfolio. During this period Button carried through major changes in industry policy, lowering tariffs and reducing other forms of protectionism. This caused large job losses in manufacturing industry and provoked bitter opposition among Labor's trade union base.

Button was responsible for the Button car plan, which reorganised the Australian car industry in an attempt to make it competitive without tariff protection.  One component of the plan was the sharing of models by local manufacturers, for example, Holden shared models with Toyota, and Ford shared models with Nissan. However, badge engineering proved unpopular from buyers, who preferred original models to their rebadged versions, and with manufacturers themselves.

Button resigned from the Senate on 31 March 1993, before his term expired on 1 July 1993. His successor, Kim Carr, who was elected in the 1993 election, was appointed to finish the remaining months of the term. In retirement he remained active in Labor affairs and published several volumes of amusing memoirs. He led a number of trade missions, joined company boards and served as a professorial fellow at Monash University. His son, James, is a prominent journalist.

In October 1994, more than 18 months after his retirement from the Senate, Button came out publicly to respond to an account made by Hawke in his memoirs. In his memoirs, Hawke wrote that in 1990, his then deputy and the man who would depose him, Keating had asked the rhetorical question of  "What has the US ever done for us?" during a meeting of Federal Cabinet's security committee to decide Australia's involvement in the Gulf War. Button responded to this account by stating that it was he not Keating who had asked that rhetorical question.

Death
John Button died on 8 April 2008 from pancreatic cancer.

References

Bibliography
Button, John (1994), Flying the kite: Travels of an Australian politician, Sydney: Random House. .
Button, John (1996), On the loose, Melbourne: Text Publishing. .
Button, John (1998), As it happened, Melbourne: Text Publishing. .
Weller, Patrick (1999), Dodging raindrops: John Button, a Labor life, Sydney: Allen & Unwin. .
Button, James (2012), Speechless: A year in my father's business, Melbourne: Melbourne University Press. .

External links
 
 James Button talk at ANU's National Centre of Biography about his "accidental" biography of his father Speechless: A Year in My Father's Business (2012), 31 July 2014.
 

1933 births
2008 deaths
Australian Labor Party members of the Parliament of Australia
People from Ballarat
Members of the Cabinet of Australia
Members of the Australian Senate
Members of the Australian Senate for Victoria
Deaths from pancreatic cancer
Deaths from cancer in Victoria (Australia)
People educated at Geelong College
Melbourne Law School alumni
20th-century Australian politicians
Government ministers of Australia